James Alexander (Lex) Fair (1926-1995 )   was Dean of Connor from 1990 until 1995.

Born in 1926 he was educated at  Trinity College, Dublin and ordained in 1950.  After curacies in Monaghan and Portadown he was the incumbent at Magherafelt, then Dean's Vicar of St Anne's Cathedral, Belfast.

References

Alumni of Trinity College Dublin
20th-century Irish Anglican priests
Deans of Connor
1926 births
1995 deaths